Zeppelin is a video game developed by German studio Ikarion and published by MicroProse for the Amiga and MS-DOS compatible operating systems in 1994.

Gameplay
Zeppelin is an economic simulation in which players build a fleet of airships.

Reception
Next Generation reviewed the PC version of the game, rating it two stars out of five, and stated that "A few extras like the two-player mode, stock market controls, and open air competitions, add little spice to what ends up being very bland fare."

In 1996, Computer Gaming World declared Zeppelin the 35th-worst computer game ever released.

In 1994, Power Play (a german computer game magazine) added it to the list of "Best 100 games in 1994" in their special edition 9.

In March 1994, ASM (Aktueller Software Markt) - a german computer and video game magazine - rated Zeppelin with 11 out of 12 and gave the award "ASM Hit/very good". "Chic presentation and an unusual game idea make a successful genre mix".

Reviews
PC Gamer (April 1995)
Computer Gaming World (Mar, 1995)
ASM (Aktueller Software Markt) - (Feb, 1994), Germany, page 24-25, Rating 92% (11 out of 12 / ASM Hit)
PC Games - (March, 1994), Germany, page 40-41, Rating 78 out of 100 (78%)
PC Games - (May, 1995)
Power Play - (March, 1994), Germany, page 78, Rating 76% good (graphics 70%, sound 77%)
PC Windows - (March, 1994), Germany, page 137, Rating: "thumbs upper right corner"
PC review - (April, 1994), Germany, page 55, Rating 6/10
PC Joker - (February, 1994), Germany, page 67, Rating 81%
Power Play Special Edition, "Best games of 1994", 1994, page 108, Rating 76%

References

1994 video games
Amiga games
DOS games
Flight simulation video games
MicroProse games
Video games developed in Germany